The Toyota JZ engine family is a series of inline-6 automobile engines produced by Toyota Motor Corporation. As a replacement for the M-series inline-6 engines, the JZ engines were 24-valve DOHC engines in 2.5- and 3.0-litre versions.

1JZ 
The  1JZ version was produced from 1990 to 2007 (last sold in the Mark II Blit Wagon and Crown Athlete). It is a 24-valve DOHC engine with two belt-driven camshafts and a dual-stage intake manifold.

1JZ-GE 
The 1JZ-GE is a common version, with a 10:1 compression ratio.

Like all JZ-series engines, the early 1JZ-GE is designed for longitudinal mounting and rear-wheel-drive. All of these models only came with a 4-speed automatic transmission; no manual gearbox option was offered.

1JZ-GTE 

The 1JZ-GTE is a twin-turbocharged version of the 1JZ, produced from 1990 to 2007. The first generation 1JZ-GTE employs twin CT12A turbochargers arranged in parallel and blowing through a side-mount or front mount air-to-air intercooler. In 1991, the 1JZ-GTE was slotted into the all-new Soarer GT.

The early generation 1JZ-GTEs combined the inherent smoothness of an inline 6-cylinder engine with the revving capacity of its short stroke and early power delivery of its small, ceramic wheeled turbochargers. The ceramic turbine wheels are prone to delamination in the setting of high impeller rpm and local temperature conditions, usually a result of higher boost. The first generation 1JZs were even more prone to turbo failure due to there being a faulty one-way valve on the head, specifically on the intake cam cover causing blow-by gases to go into the intake manifold. On the exhaust side, a decent amount of oil vapor flows into the turbos causing premature wear on the seals. The later second generation engines had this problem fixed. In Japan, there was a recall made in order to repair the first generation engines, however this does not apply to 1JZs imported into other countries. 

The third generation of the 1JZ-GTE was introduced around 1996, still as a 2.5-litre turbo, but with Toyota's BEAMS architecture. This included a reworked head, newly developed continuously variable valve timing mechanism (VVT-i), modified water jackets for improved cylinder cooling and newly developed shims with a titanium nitride coating for reduced cam friction. The turbo setup changed from parallel twin turbo (CT12A x2) to a single turbo (CT15B). The single turbo is in part made more efficient by the use of smaller exhaust ports in the head, this allows the escaping exhaust gasses to have more velocity as they exit the head, which in turn, spools the turbo faster and at lower RPM.The adoption of VVT-i and the improved cylinder cooling allowed the compression ratio to be increased from 8.5:1 to 9.0:1. These improvements resulted in increased engine efficiency that reduced fuel consumption by 10%. The adoption of VVTi, a much higher efficiency single turbocharger than the twins as well as different manifold and exhaust ports were responsible for most of the 50% torque increase at low engine speeds. This engine was used primarily in Toyota's X chassis cars (Chaser, Mark II, Cresta, Verossa, Blit), the Crown Athlete V (JZS171) and in the later JZZ30 Soarer, as the JZA70 Supra had long been discontinued at this time.

Applications:
 Toyota Chaser/Cresta/Mark II 2.5GT Twin Turbo (JZX81)
 Toyota Chaser/Cresta/Mark II Tourer V/Roulant G (JZX90, JZX100)
 Toyota Mark II iR-V (JZX110)
 Toyota Mark II Blit iR-V (JZX110W)
 Toyota Soarer 2.5 GT-T(JZZ30)
 Toyota Supra MK III 2.5 Twin Turbo (R) (JZA70)
 Toyota Verossa VR25 (JZX110)
 Toyota Crown Athlete V (JZS171)

1JZ-FSE 
Around 2000, Toyota introduced what are quite probably the least-recognized members of the JZ engine family: the FSE direct injection variants. These FSE 1JZ and 2JZ engines are aimed at achieving minimal emissions and fuel consumption together with no loss of performance.

The 2.5-litre 1JZ-FSE employs the same block as the conventional 1JZ-GE; however, the design of the cylinder head is unique.
The ‘D4’ FSE employs a relatively narrow angle cylinder head with swirl control valves that serve to improve combustion efficiency.
This is necessary to run at extremely lean air-fuel ratios around 20 to 40:1 at certain engine load and revs. Not surprisingly, fuel consumption is reduced by around 20 percent (when tested in the Japanese 10/15 urban mode). Normal unleaded fuel is enough to cope with the FSE's 11:1 compression ratio.

The direct injection version of the 1JZ generates  and  – virtually the same as the conventional VVT-i 1JZ-GE. The 1JZ-FSE is always used with an automatic transmission.

Applications:
Mark II
Mark II Blit
Brevis
Progres
Verossa
Crown

2JZ 
The  2JZ has been produced from 1991 (first released in the 1991 Toyota Aristo) to 2007. VVT-i variable valve timing was first introduced in 1995 starting with the 2JZ-GE, but did not come to the 2JZ-GTE and the US-market until mid-1997 for the 1998 model year onwards. This engine is not merely a stroked version of the 1JZ (although they share a common bore size, bore pitch, and general architecture), but has a taller block deck and longer connecting rods to accommodate the  stroke increase.

2JZ-GE 
The 2JZ-GE is a common version.

It uses Sequential Electronic Fuel Injection, has an aluminium head and 4 valves per cylinder, along with a cast-iron cylinder block. VVT-i was first introduced to the engines in 1995. The VVT-i version also featured DIS as opposed to the traditional distributor set-up previously seen on the 1JZ-GE. Despite the common misconception, it was not a true COP (Coil-On-Plug, also known as Plug-top coil) ignition system, instead relying on one coil to fire two cylinders, one of which was by spark plug wire.

Applications:
 Toyota Altezza AS 300/Lexus IS 300
 Toyota Aristo/Lexus GS 300
 Toyota Crown/Crown Majesta
 Toyota Mark II/Chaser/Cresta
Toyota Origin
 Toyota Progres
 Toyota Soarer/Lexus SC 300
 Toyota Supra

2JZ-GTE 

The 2JZ-GTE is an inline-layout, six-cylinder, belt-driven dual overhead camshaft, air-intercooled, twin-turbocharged, cast-iron block, aluminium cylinder head engine designed and manufactured by Toyota Motor Corporation that was produced from 1991 to 2002 in Japan. It originally powered the Toyota Aristo V (JZS147) in 1991 before becoming Toyota's flagship performance engine in the Toyota Supra RZ (JZA80) in 1993.

Development and evolution of the engine was, principally, a response to Nissan's relatively new and then-successful RB26DETT engine, which had achieved much success in FIA Group A and Group N touring car championships.

Its mechanical basis was of the existing 2JZ-GE, but differed in its use of sequential twin turbochargers and an air-to-air side-mounted intercooler. The engine block, crankshaft, and connecting rods of the Supra's 2JZ-GE and 2JZ-GTE are the same, with notable differences being that the 2JZ-GTE has recessed piston tops (giving a lower compression ratio), oil spray nozzles to aid in cooling the pistons and a different head (redesigned inlet/exhaust ports, cams and valves). Toyota's VVT-i variable valve timing technology was added to the engine beginning in September 1997, and hence it phased out production of the original engine in Japan. Consequently, maximum torque and horsepower was raised for engines selling in all markets. The later 2JZ-GE VVT-i equipped models (Aristo, Altezza and Mark II) shared a different part number for weaker connecting rods.

The mutually agreed, industry-wide output ceiling was enforced by Japan's now-defunct Gentlemen's Agreement exclusively between Japanese automakers selling to the Japanese domestic market.

The export version of the 2JZ-GTE achieved its higher power output with the use of newer stainless steel turbochargers (ceramic for Japanese models), revised camshafts, and larger injectors (550 cc/min for export, 440 cc/min for Japanese). The mechanical similarities between the Japanese-specification CT20 turbine and export-specification CT12B turbine allow interchangeability of the exhaust-side propeller shaft. Additionally, the export-exclusive CT12B turbine received more durable turbine housings and stainless steel turbine and impeller fins. Multiple variants of the Japanese CT20 turbine exist discretely, which are identified with the B, R, and A part number suffixes (e.g.: CT20A).

For all road car applications, two gearboxes were available for the engine:
Toyota A340E 4-speed automatic
Toyota V160 and V161 6-speed manual (jointly developed with Getrag as the Type 233)

Applications:
 Toyota Aristo 3.0V JZS147 (Japan-only)
 Toyota Aristo V300 JZS161 (Japan-only)
 Toyota Supra RZ/Turbo JZA80

2JZ-FSE 
Around 2000, Toyota introduced what are quite probably the least-recognized members of the JZ engine family: the FSE direct injection variants. These FSE 1JZ and 2JZ engines are aimed at achieving minimal emissions and fuel consumption together with no loss of performance.

The 3.0-litre 2JZ-FSE uses the same direct injection principle as the smaller 1JZ-FSE but runs an even higher 11.3:1 compression ratio. The 2JZ-FSE is always used with an automatic transmission.

Applications:
Toyota Brevis
Toyota Progres
Toyota Crown (S170)
Toyota Crown Majesta (S170)

See also 
 List of Toyota engines
 Lexus GS
 Toyota Supra

References

External links 

 AutoSpeed's Toyota JZ engine guide

JZ
Straight-six engines